Orsinome is a genus of long-jawed orb-weavers that was first described by Tamerlan Thorell in 1890. It is included in the Nanometa clade, defined by nine morphological synapomorphies, along with Eryciniolia and Nanometa.

Species
 it contains thirteen species, found in Oceania, Asia, and on Madagascar:
Orsinome armata Pocock, 1901 – India
Orsinome cavernicola (Thorell, 1878) – Indonesia (Ambon)
Orsinome daiqin Zhu, Song & Zhang, 2003 – China
Orsinome diporusa Zhu, Song & Zhang, 2003 – China
Orsinome elberti Strand, 1911 – Timor
Orsinome jiarui Zhu, Song & Zhang, 2003 – China
Orsinome lorentzi Kulczyński, 1911 – New Guinea
Orsinome megaloverpa Hormiga & Kallal, 2018 – Philippines
Orsinome monulfi Chrysanthus, 1971 – New Guinea
Orsinome phrygiana Simon, 1901 – Malaysia
Orsinome pilatrix (Thorell, 1878) – Indonesia (Ambon)
Orsinome trappensis Schenkel, 1953 – China
Orsinome vethi (Hasselt, 1882) (type) – India, China, Vietnam, Laos, Malaysia, Indonesia (Sumatra, Java, Flores)

In synonymy:
O. listeri Gravely, 1921 = Orsinome vethi (Hasselt, 1882)
O. nepula (Tikader, 1970) = Orsinome vethi (Hasselt, 1882)

See also
 List of Tetragnathidae species
 Eryciniolia
 Nanometa

References

Araneomorphae genera
Spiders of Asia
Spiders of Madagascar
Spiders of Oceania
Taxa named by Tamerlan Thorell
Tetragnathidae